Pterogyne is a monotypic genus in the legume family, Fabaceae. The sole species is Pterogyne nitens. Spanish common names include guiraró, palo coca, or tipa colorado. In Portuguese, it is commonly known as amendoim bravo, cocal or madeira nova. It is found in Brazil, Paraguay, Bolivia and Argentina.  It is threatened by habitat loss and harvesting for timber.

Five guanidine alkaloid natural products were isolated from the leaves of ''Pterogyne nitens: nitensidine D, nitensidine E, pterogynine, pterogynidine, and galegine.

References

Flora of Argentina
Flora of Bolivia
Flora of Brazil
Flora of Paraguay
Caesalpinioideae
Monotypic Fabaceae genera
Taxonomy articles created by Polbot